The Papuan rainbowfish (Melanotaenia papuae) is a species of rainbowfish in the Melanotaeniinae family. It is endemic to southern Papua New Guinea around Port Moresby.

References 

Melanotaenia
Freshwater fish of Papua New Guinea
Taxonomy articles created by Polbot
Fish described in 1981